Beloretsk steelmaking plant (Beloretskiy Metallurgicheskiy Kombinat; ,), abbreviated as BMK, is the steel company in Russia. It is located in the city of Beloretsk, in Bashkortostan.

History
Located in the mineral-rich Ural region, which marks the border between Europe and Asia, the Beloretsk iron ore deposit was discovered in 1762. The exploration efforts for industrial minerals near the Magnitnaya Mountain were undertaken by the two investors, Ivan Tverdyshev and Ivan Myasnikov, who submitted a petition for their right to extracting crude metal from ore. After their petition was granted by the Orenburg government in 1759, mining was soon started.

In 1762, an iron foundry was established in Beloretsk. The first builders and industrial workers at the foundry were serfs from Simbirsk, Arzamas, Nizhny Novgorod, Kazan, Alatyr and other provinces of the Russian Empire. Even in its early years the foundry produced 122.5 thousand pounds of pig iron and 80 thousand pounds of iron per year.

Due to the Pugachev uprising in 1773, the Beloretsk Foundry was ruined and burnt down, but three years later it was restored, and by 1777 the enterprise rebounded significantly, producing 110,131 poods of pig iron. 

In 1784, the Beloretsk Foundry changed its owner, passing into the possession of Ivan Myasnikov's eldest daughter who got married the nobleman A.I. Pashkov. The foundry was given to him as a dowry. 

By 1800, pig iron produced at the foundry was considered to be of high quality and one of the cheapest in the Urals. Beloretsk iron (called "Pashkovsky") was famous for its light malleability and ductility.

In 1866, the Beloretsk Foundry was taken into state custody, and in 1874 the joint-stock company "Pashkov's Beloretsk Foundry" was established. It was owned by the Moscow trading house "Vogau and Co.", which initiated efforts to reprofile the enterprise. The old blast furnaces were modernized, their height and volume increased. Finery process also underwent significant restructuring. In 1876, the old refining furnaces were replaced by 12 more high-performance Swedish ones. 

In 1894, a first open-hearth furnace was put into operation. The furnace had a capacity of 915 pounds (15 tons) of steel. 
Charge material, including pig iron, was loaded cold by hand. Ore was transported by horses from the Magnitnaya Mountain. By 1900, steel production increased to 13,414 tons.

In 1882, a rolling shop was launched at the foundry and rolling mills of different types  were installed - large-grade, small-grade and wire ones. In 1912, the slouching and harvesting mill "650" was put into operation. The mill rolled high-grade iron, a billet and a slouch for rolling onto a sheet.

From 1912, a narrow-gauge railway was laid that had a length of about 400 kilometers and connected the villages of Zaprudovka (Katav-Ivanovsk), Inzer and Toukan with Beloretsk. For decades, it has been a transport artery for the delivery of the plant's products and a link between its numerous remote divisions.

In 1913-1914, the foundry's power plant was built. In 1915, the open-hearth shop was reconstructed, and in the same year, the enterprise began to produce round and square wire rods.

In 1914, a wire and nail factory was put into operation. Its three buildings contained a drawing shop with metal etching and annealing departments, a nail shop, a workshop for making telegraph hooks, as well as a mechanical workshop and a step-down substation. A year later, a horseshoe nails workshop was built, and two years later, a barbed wire workshop began operating.

During the Revolution and Civil War, between 1917 and 1920, the Beloretsk Foundry stopped its production and resumed running only in 1921. In the 1930s, the foundry was actively employing new types of products: in 1923, the enterprise began manufacturing steel wire for the first time in Russia. In August 1925, the first rope machines were installed, and in 1936, new machines were put into operation that allowed to produce extremely thin steel cables.

In 1940, the Beloretsk Foundry was reorganized into a combine (enterprise), including mining, metallurgical, and Tirlyansk sheet-rolling production facilities. During the Great Patriotic War, several hardware factories (from Moscow, Odessa, Khartsyzsk) were evacuated to the enterprise. Steel production increased significantly, reaching its peak in 1943 (160 thousand tons, or 146% of the pre-war 1940 level). The combine began to produce wire from alloyed steel grades, smelted by the open-hearth method for the needs of defense industry.

In 1959, several previously independent facilities were merged into one steelmaking plant, resulted in the creation of an enterprise carrying out all steps of steelmaking from smelting iron ore to metal wares of high quality. 

By the 1950s, the Beloretsk steelmaking plant produced a particularly strong type of metal cord from extremely thin latuned wire for reinforcing automobile and aircraft tires by using unique technology. The plant also began manufacturing micron-sized wire from alloy steels and resistance alloys.

In 1961, a metal cord workshop was put into operation, and in 1962 — a high-strength wire workshop. In 1970, a large amount of work was carried out by the plant's team to put into operation the alloyed wire workshop.

In 1980, the highly automated rolling mill "150" was launched, with a capacity of 400 thousand tons of wire rod per year.

In 2002, the plant's blast furnaces and open-hearth furnaces were decommissioned for economic reasons, and steel wire rope production has become the basis for the enterprise's production.

In 2003, the plant became part of the "Mechel" company, and since 2016, it has been officially known as Joint-Stock Company "Beloretsk Metallurgical Combine".

In 2012, the Beloretsk steelmaking plant celebrated the 250th anniversary of its foundation, in honor of which a monument to Ivan Tverdyshev was unveiled on the plant's square. The 2.5-meter-high sculpture was cast at the Kasli Architectural and Artistic Casting Plant. The author of the sculpture was the sculptor Natalya Kulikova.

In June 2021, a new wire production line was put into operation at the plant.

References

Steel companies of Russia
Steel companies of the Russian Soviet Federative Socialist Republic
Companies based in Bashkortostan